Stefan Nilsson (born 12 August 1990) is a Swedish sport shooter. At the 2012 Summer Olympics he competed in the Men's skeet, finishing in 15th place. He competed in the same event again at the 2016 Summer Olympics, finishing 5th.

He has qualified to represent Sweden at the 2020 Summer Olympics in the Men's skeet.

References

Swedish male sport shooters
Living people
Olympic shooters of Sweden
Shooters at the 2012 Summer Olympics
Shooters at the 2016 Summer Olympics
Shooters at the 2015 European Games
European Games silver medalists for Sweden
European Games medalists in shooting
Shooters at the 2019 European Games
European Games gold medalists for Sweden
1990 births
Shooters at the 2020 Summer Olympics
21st-century Swedish people